Dakshinakokarnesvarar Temple, Pulivalam is a Siva temple in Pulivalam  in Tiruvarur district in Tamil Nadu (India).

Vaippu Sthalam
It is one of the shrines of the Vaippu Sthalams sung by Tamil Saivite Nayanar Appar.  This place is found in Thiruvarur-Thiruthuraipoondi road at a distance of 3 km from Pulivalam.

Presiding deity
The presiding deity is Dakshinakokarnesvarar. The Goddess is known as Anandavalli.

Other places
There are also two other places with this name in Tiruchirappalli district. They are in Manachanallur-Thuraiyur road and near Jeeyapuram at Tiruchirappalli.

References

Shiva temples in Tiruvarur district